QSI International School of Ljubljana (QSIL) is a school in Slovenia that caters to students from 15 different nationalities ranging from 3 to 18 years of age. It was established in 1995 and instruction of its core classes are carried out in English by native English speakers. QSIL also offers Slovene (language and culture), German, French, and Spanish to all students from 5 to 18 years old. QSI International School of Ljubljana (QSIL) offers an academic program that is based on mastery learning.  The program emphasizes mathematics, the sciences, social studies, English, art, fine arts, and PE. The location near a river and woods offers an opportunity for outdoor education as well. It is operated by Quality Schools International, a global consortium of 39 non-profit schools in 27 countries.

Location
QSI International School of Ljubljana is located in Ljubljana's Vič District. It is partially surrounded by woods, and the Mali Graben—a branch of the Gradaščica River—flows past the school to the east. The closest facilities include the Dolgi Most Sports Center, immediately north of the school.

References

External links

QSI International School of Ljubljana website
International School of Ljubljana at Geopedia

International schools in Slovenia
Schools in Ljubljana
Primary schools in Slovenia
Secondary schools in Slovenia
Educational institutions established in 1995
1995 establishments in Slovenia